Romance Rides the Range is a 1936 American Western film directed by Harry L. Fraser and written by Tom Gibson. The film stars Fred Scott, Cliff Nazarro, Marion Shilling, Buzz Barton, Bob Kortman and Theodore Lorch. The film was released on September 1, 1936, by Spectrum Pictures.

This film was Fred Scott's first starring role as a singing cowboy.

Plot

Cast           
Fred Scott as Barry Glendon
Cliff Nazarro as 'Shorty'
Marion Shilling as Carol Marland
Buzz Barton as Jimmy Marland
Bob Kortman as Clem Allen 
Theodore Lorch as Jonas Allen
Frank Yaconelli as Tony 
Jack Evans as Buck 
Phil Dunham as Doctor
Billy Steuer as Slick

References

External links
 

1936 films
1930s English-language films
American Western (genre) films
1936 Western (genre) films
Films directed by Harry L. Fraser
American black-and-white films
1930s American films